The Africa Gospel Unity Church was founded in 1964 by an untrained pastor who left the National Holiness Mission.  The Africa Gospel Unity Church adheres to the 1689 Baptist Confession of Faith. Most congregations are in rural areas. The church's leadership is all-male. In 2004, there were 3,500 members in eighty congregations and eighty house fellowships.

History of Church
Per reformiert-online.net: "The AGUC was formed in 1964 by an untrained pastor who left the National Holiness Mission after a dispute over administrative matters. Due to negligence and insufficiently qualified personnel, disorder in the membership and in the church grew (for example, polygamists were admitted to church office). Fellowship in 1970 with the EACE and the ICCC (membership was later dropped) brought the church in touch with missionaries of the IBPFM and with Ref theology. A group of younger pastors, trained at the Bible College of East Africa, were instrumental in reforming the church in 1982 by removing polygamous leaders and rewriting its constitution. The AGUC maintains the Baptist Confession of Faith (1689). Most of the congregation are in rural areas. The need for worship places within walking distance has been met by establishing numerous preaching stations and training additional lay preachers. Two thirds of Sunday worshipers are not communicant members yet. Every month each regional council holds an “evangelistic outreach” in which visits from house to house are made."

Church Statistics
Members total: 3500, admitted to participate in the Lord's Supper: 2000, baptised: 2000   
Parishes(conventionally): 80 
House fellowships (Number of growing parishes): 80 
Ordained clergy total: 11, Men: 11, no women's ordination
Elders/Presbyters total: 95, men: 95
 Deacons total: 160, Men: 130, Women: 30  
Missionaries total: 0 missionaries do not work abroad 
Baptismal practice: Believer's Baptism
Godparents: no godparents
Lord's Supper: Frequency per annum: 4
Theological training facilities: Number: 1
Founded in: 1964 
Organizational structures: local church, district, region, and central church councils 
Official languages: English, Swahili
Languages during church services: English, Swahili 
Confessions: Apostles´ Creed

Location
AGUC, P.O. Box 33, 20400 Bomet, Kenya (Africa), Address-No.: 1394 / 1069

References

Reformed denominations in Africa
Protestantism in Kenya
1964 establishments in Kenya
Christian organizations established in 1964